Filip II or Philip II (full name: Special Hospital for Surgical Diseases "Filip II"/"Philip II", also known as Zan Mitrev Clinic) (Macedonian: Специјална болница по хируршки болести "Филип II"; Specijalna bolnica po hirurški bolesti "Filip II") is a special hospital for cardiovascular surgery in Skopje, North Macedonia. It is located inside the building of the military hospital in the Karpoš municipality of Skopje and is the only hospital of its kind in the country. It was opened in March 2000. It bears the name of ancient Macedonian king Philip II of Macedon.

References

Buildings and structures in Skopje
Hospitals in North Macedonia
Hospitals established in 2000
2000 establishments in the Republic of Macedonia